The Kamloops NorthPaws are a collegiate summer baseball team located in Kamloops, British Columbia. The NorthPaws are members of the West Coast League and play their home games at NorBrock Stadium. They are scheduled to begin play in 2021.

History 
The Kamloops NorthPaws were founded in 2020 as an expansion member of the West Coast League. The franchise was announced on September 9, 2020, by owners Norm Daley,  Neal Perry, and Jon Pankuch. The moniker NorthPaws was selected to denote Canadian pride and show cohesion among local baseball programs. Additionally, the name is a play on the term southpaw. The colors red and black were chosen with the incorporation of cream to provide a vintage look. Surrey native, Cole Armstrong was tabbed as the club's first manager.

2022 Season
The Northpaws are second in the north division with a 12-9 record. First Baseman Zack Beatty (hometown: Maple Park, Illinois) is fifth in the league with four home runs. Pitcher Ben Polack (hometown: Modesto, California) is fourth in the league with three wins. Pitcher Vic Domingo (hometown: Vancouver, British Columbia is seventh in wins with two. Pitcher Colby Ring (hometown: Langley, British Columbia) is sixth in the league in strikeouts (22). The Northpaws have seen 8,260 total fans for an average of 751 fans per game.

Season-by-Season Record

References

External links
 Official Website

Amateur baseball teams in Canada
Baseball teams in British Columbia
Baseball teams established in 2020
2020 establishments in British Columbia